Beau Ideal is a 1927 novel by P. C. Wren. It was the second sequel to his 1924 novel Beau Geste.

It was adapted into the 1931 film Beau Ideal.

Plot
The story is of Otis Vanbrugh, brother of Hank and Mary Vanbrugh, who featured in Beau Sabreur. Otis and Mary leave a despotic father in Wyoming and make the Grand Tour of Europe. After meeting a French colonel their travel extends to North Africa. There their adventures become intwined with those already narrated in Beau Sabreur and Beau Geste. In this third volume, and second sequel, definite disclosure  is made of what happened the night the Blue Water was stolen and by whom (Wren will elaborate this part again in Spanish Maine). Raoul d'Auray de Redon appears as an unsung hero of the French Secret Service. Beau Ideal is the "American" novel of the so called trilogy (which in fact spreads through five books), as Beau Geste is the "British" novel and Beau Sabreur is the "French" novel. It is a tale of "ideal and platonic love".

Mainly the plot revolves around the devotion of Otis for Isobel Geste (nee Rivers). He is asked by Isobel to find her husband John, who has disappeared in Africa while searching for his old friends Hank and Buddy. Otis, who was a childhood playmate of John and who is in love with Isobel, enlists in the French Foreign Legion with the idea of being sentenced to the penal battalion of the French Army of Africa (les Joyeux), and so find John and try to rescue him.

Arabs raid the section of the penal battalion and capture Otis and John. The Arab girl the Death Angel falls in love with Otis and provides aid, opening the line for the ending of the saga, until rehashed in "Spanish Maine".

All is stitched and finished (with an elaborated and convoluted detail of what really happened the night the Blue Water was stolen) in "Spanish Maine". Fifth volume of the adventures of John Geste (the fourth "Good Gestes" is a collection of short stories, and there is also another short one in "Flawed Blades").

References

External links
 
Full text of book at Project Gutenberg

1927 British novels
British novels adapted into films
English adventure novels
John Murray (publishing house) books